Protein phosphatase 1B is an enzyme that in humans is encoded by the PPM1B gene.

Function 

The protein encoded by this gene is a member of the PP2C family of Ser/Thr protein phosphatases. PP2C family members are known to be negative regulators of cell stress response pathways. This phosphatase has been shown to dephosphorylate cyclin-dependent kinases (CDKs), and thus may be involved in cell cycle control. Overexpression of this phosphatase is reported to cause cell-growth arrest or cell death. Alternative splicing results in multiple transcript variants encoding different isoforms. Additional transcript variants have been described, but currently do not represent full-length sequences.

Interactions 
PPM1B has been shown to interact with:
 CDK2, 
 CDK6, 
 CHUK,
 IKBKG, 
 IKK2, 
 MAP3K7, and
 PPARγ.

References

Further reading